King Ranch is the largest ranch in the United States.  At some  it is larger than the state of Rhode Island and country of Luxembourg. It is mainly a cattle ranch, but also produced the Triple Crown winning racehorse Assault.

The ranch is located in South Texas between Corpus Christi and Brownsville adjacent to Kingsville.  It was founded in 1853 by Captain Richard King and Gideon K. Lewis. It includes portions of six Texas counties; most of Kleberg and much of Kenedy, with portions extending into Brooks, Jim Wells, Nueces, and Willacy counties.

The ranch does not consist of one single contiguous plot of land, but rather four large sections called divisions. The divisions are the Santa Gertrudis, the Laureles, the Encino and the Norias. Only the first two of the four divisions border each other, and that border is relatively short. The ranch was designated a National Historic Landmark in 1961. The Texas Cowboy Hall of Fame inducted the ranch in 2019. King Ranch was one of the very first ranches to be added to the National Register of Historic Places on October 15, 1966, because of the National Historic Preservation Act of 1966 which was signed that same day.

History

Richard King (1824–1885) was a river pilot, born in New York City to Irish immigrants. He was indentured to a jeweler at age 11, but later ran to sea, eventually attaining a pilot's rating. In 1843, King first met his future business partner in the King Ranch, Mifflin Kenedy (1818–1895), captain of the steamboat Champion. Both served under General Zachary Taylor (later the 12th US president) operating steamboats from Brazos Santiago Harbor in Texas, USA, to Matamoros in Mexico, and on up river to Camargo, Tamaulipas, in support of the U.S. invasion of Monterrey and Saltillo. After the Mexican–American War, King made a good living hauling merchandise on the Rio Grande, as far up river as Camargo, and Rio Grande City. In the meantime, Kenedy was able to make money by carrying goods overland into Mexico. By March 1, 1850, King, Kenedy, Charles Stillman, founder of Brownsville, and James O'Donnell entered into a business partnership (M. Kenedy & Co.) to transport Stillman's goods from Brazos Santiago Harbor on the Gulf of Mexico and up the Rio Grande. The enterprise required two types of steamers — the Grampus and Comanche. During the American Civil War, the steamboat fleet was reflagged under the name of the Matamoros, Mexico citizen Francisco Iturria and the Mexican flag. As Mexico was a neutral country, the steamboats could not be stopped by Union blockaders, and engaged in a lively commerce of transporting Texas cotton to many deep-water ships anchored offshore Matamoros, on the Mexican side of the Rio Grande. Stillman sold his share of the enterprise after the Civil War; the new firm operated as King, Kenedy & Co. until 1874.

King first saw the land that would become part of the King Ranch in April 1852 as he traveled north from Brownsville to attend the Lone Star Fair in Corpus Christi, a four-day trip by horseback. After a grueling ride, King caught sight of the Santa Gertrudis Creek,  from the Rio Grande. It was the first stream he had seen on the Wild Horse Desert. The land, which was shaded by large mesquite trees, so impressed him, when he arrived at the fair, he and a friend, Texas Ranger Captain Gideon K. "Legs" Lewis, agreed then and there to make it into a ranch.

The King Ranch LK brand, still in use today, stands for partners Lewis and King.

King and Lewis established a cow camp on Santa Gertrudis Creek. During this time, Richard King purchased the Rincón de Santa Gertrudis grant, a  holding that encompassed present-day Kingsville, Texas. It was purchased from the heirs of Juan Mendiola of Camargo on July 25, 1853, for $300. King sold Lewis an undivided half-interest in the land for $2,000. At the same time, Lewis sold King undivided half-interest in the ranchos of Manuel Barrera and of Juan Villareal for the same sum, on November 14, 1853. As the years passed, more land was added, growing to 1.2 million acres (1,875 sq mi, 4,900 km²) at its largest extent, until reaching its current total.

In 1855, Lewis was killed by the husband of a woman with whom he had been having an affair. On July 1, 1856, a court sale of Lewis' property (including the undivided half-interest in the land of the Ranch) was held. King had arranged for Major W. W. Chapman (died 1859) to bid on the Rincón property, which Chapman acquired for $1,575. Chapman had been the quartermaster of Fort Brown in Brownsville, and regulated the steamboat contracts to supply Fort Ringgold, up river in Rio Grande City. Chapman's heirs published the letters home from his wife in the 1992 book The News From Brownsville.

King interested Captain James Walworth in acquiring the entire de la Garza grant, which Walworth completed on December 26, 1856, for $5,000 paid to Praxides Uribe. King thus retained operational control of the Ranch, with Walworth as a silent partner who held title to the land, and who paid taxes on it.

King and Walworth's livestock brand was registered June 27, 1859, along with his earlier brands. (see below)

When King and his partners began hiring people to staff the ranch, they hired a number of Mexican hands. In one notable case, King traveled to the village of Cruillas, Tamaulipas, Mexico in the early months of 1854 (the village having been decimated by a severe drought) and purchased the village's entire cattle population. But shortly after leaving the village, King realized that, by solving the village's short-term problem by providing needed income to survive the drought, he created a longer-term one, by removing its source of future income. King thus returned to Cruillas and offered the villagers the opportunity to work for him, in exchange for food, shelter, and income. Many of the villagers accepted King's offer and relocated to Texas. As the ranch grew, these workers came to be called kineños, or "King's men". Over time, some original grantees returned to their land. King once said he "could not have kept on and held on if Andrés Canales had not been adjoining."

Records show a Mexican range cow cost $6 in 1854, a mustang horse cost $6, and a stud horse cost $200–300. In sum, in 1854, King paid $12,275.79. Lea estimated the 1855 expenses were smaller. The first brand was the ere flecha (an R with arrow through it).

In 1859, the ranch recorded its first official brands (HK and LK). In 1869, the ranch registered its "Running W" brand, which remains the King Ranch's official mark today. At the time, the ranch grazed cattle, horses, sheep and goats. By the mid-1870s, though, the ranch's hallmark stock had become the hardy Texas Longhorn. The ranch also boasted several Brahman bulls, as well as Beef Shorthorns and Herefords.

The Brahmans, which were native to South Asia, were well adapted to thrive in South Texas' hot climate; they were crossed with the ranch's Beef Shorthorns to produce the ranch's own trademark stock — the Santa Gertrudis cattle, which were recognized as a breed in 1940.

Lea portrays King's purchase of the Ranch as motivated by his wooing of Henrietta Maria Morse Chamberlain (1832–1925), whom he married in the First Presbyterian Church, Brownsville, on Sunday, December 10, 1854. The King Ranch HK livestock brand stands for Henrietta King.

In the United States Civil War, initially, the disruption of the flow of cattle to market caused a drop in beef prices. In 1861, the price of cattle dropped to $2 a head, rising to $11 per head by August 1862.

The 1863–1864 winter pushed uncounted cattle south toward the Nueces River and Rio Grande. By the end of the Civil War, the Texas Rangers were disbanded by the following reconstruction of the United States. It became too tempting to simply herd cattle across the Nueces or Rio Grande.

Even in this time of loss, by 1869, King was able to round up 48,664 of an estimated 84,000 head of cattle. Allowing for 10,000 remaining, King claimed a loss of 33,827 head from 1869 to 1872.

To handle depredations (rustling), the ranchers formed the Stock Raisers Association of Western Texas in 1870; Mifflin Kenedy led the first meeting.

By 1874, the Texas Rangers were re-established, and were a factor in controlling the depredations.

By 1870, 300,000 head of cattle made their way from the West to the railroads of Kansas, and thence to the stockyards of Chicago. On a Texas ranch, a steer worth $11 would bring $20 from a buyer in Abilene. The buyer in turn could ask $31.50 at the Union Stock Yards. King could drive his cattle for a hundred days to the railheads of Kansas.

By 1871, though, 700,000 head of cattle caused a market glut, which King avoided by personal negotiation in Abilene.

King managed to avoid the September 19, 1873, 'Black Friday panic' by selling early. During the lean year that followed, King continued to fence his land, and manage  his cattle, horses and sheep.

One technique King used to manage costs was to make his trail bosses the owners of the herd. The bosses would sign a note for the cattle, which they would begin to drive to market in February of each year, for the 100-day drive. The bosses were also the employers of the outfit. Upon the sale of the herd to the northern buyers, the trail bosses could relieve their indebtedness, and earn a profit greater than their ordinary wages.

At the death of Henrietta King in 1925, the ranch totaled 1.2 million acres that were divided among her heirs. Bob Kleberg and his wife Alice inherited over 800,000 acres that were incorporated as the King Ranch in 1934.  The appraiser's Statement of Gross Estate, Mrs. H. M. King listed a net total of $5.4 million, as the owner of 997,444.56 acres (4,036.5 km2), which did not include the Santa Gertrudis headquarters, nor did it include the Kleberg's Stillman and Lasater tracts, which were not of the estate. Her son-in-law, Bob Kleberg, Sr., said "A valuation of four to five dollars an acre ($1236/km²) on a million acres (4000 km²) of raw ranchland was about right, but it took a long time for the Government to admit it." By 1929, the taxes ($859,000) had been paid up, in installments, but the trustees had to borrow money, so by the market crash of 1929, Henrietta King's estate was in debt $3,000,000.

Robert Justus Kleberg Jr. and Alice Gertrudis King had one child named Helen. In 1933, Robert Jr. leased the exploration and drilling rights on the ranch to Humble Oil of Houston, Texas, for $127,824, in exchange for the usual royalty of 1/8 of every barrel of oil (20 L) pumped from the property. Humble Oil loaned enough money to pay the debts of the H.M. King estate, secured by a first mortgage on the land. Humble struck oil and gas by 1939. During all of this, the Ranch was a going concern, with a net profit of $227,382, as early as 1926. Kleberg was married to Helen Campbell, and together they had one child they named Helen.

Lauro Cavazos, who served as the first Hispanic United States Cabinet officer, was born on the King Ranch during his father's service as a ranch foreman in January, 1927.

 

On November 18, 1936, Luther Blanton and his son, John, trespassed on the ranch by crawling through the fence surrounding it. They had intended to hunt ducks and nearby residents reported hearing shots fired. Shortly thereafter, locals organized a group to force their way onto the ranch around the area where they were known to have gone hunting. However, neither Blanton nor his son were ever seen again. A subsequent police investigation resulted in no arrests. Although most residents suspected them being murdered by ranch guards for trespassing, it remains a long-standing unsolved mystery.

In 1999, the Ford Motor Company began using the King Ranch brand on its vehicles.  Over the years there have been King Ranch versions of the Ford F-150, Super Duty, Explorer, and the Expedition.  The vehicles include dark brown leather seats, and the badges show the King Ranch 'Running W' brand.

In popular culture
Edna Ferber's novel Giant of the ranches of Texas was turned into a film of the same name. Many of the events of the King Ranch, such as the discovery of oil on the property, are also in the film. Working-class millionaires can still be found in the oil towns of Texas, as well.

Forever Texas, the 2022 historical western novel by bestselling authors William W. Johnstone and J.A. Johnstone, is based on the true story of the founding of King Ranch.

In the James Michener novel Centennial, the Venneford Ranch was said to be patterned after the King Ranch.

The historical fiction novel Lords of the Land by Matt Braun is based on the King Ranch and its founder, although names and some circumstance have been altered.

A cowboy's perspective on the King Ranch subsidiary in Australia, the cattle station Brunette Downs, is captured in the 2012 autobiography by Nick Campbell-Jones Don't Die Wondering. Campbell-Jones was a jackaroo (Australian cowboy) who started at Brunette Downs in 1963 and worked his way up to overseer and assistant manager before leaving in 1975.

See also

Anna Creek Station
List of ranches and stations
List of the largest stations in Australia

Footnotes
 Lea, p. 2: For King's biographical details, Lea cites Richard King's sworn deposition before F.J. Parker, U.S. Commissioner, Eastern District of Texas, April 11, 1870, filed with the U.S. and Mexican Claims Commission, Washington, D.C., August 30, 1870.—Records of Boundary and Claims Commission and Arbitrations, Claims vs. Mexico - 1868, Claim No. 579, RG 76 GSA, National Archives and Records Services, Washington, D.C.
 Lea, pp128–9. Notes from the King Ranch vault in Henrietta King's handwriting.
 ,: Reminiscences by Henrietta King to members of her family.

References

Further reading
 John Cypher, Bob Kleberg and the King Ranch: A Worldwide Sea of Grass, 
 Don Graham, The Kings of Texas: The 150-Year Saga of an American Ranching Empire, 
 Groves, Helen Kleberg (April 2017), Bob and Helen Kleberg of King Ranch. San Antonio, Texas: Trinity University Press. 
 Tom Lea (1957), The King Ranch. Two volumes. 838 pages. Index. Maps and drawings by the author. Boston: Little, Brown. Library of Congress catalog card:57-7839

External links

Four generations of Kineños: 1854-1980
The Texas Experience - Waylon Jennings Presents the King Ranch, from the Texas Archive of the Moving Image

Ranches in Texas
American racehorse owners and breeders
Owners of Kentucky Derby winners
Breeders of Kentucky Derby winners
Owners of Preakness Stakes winners
Breeders of Preakness Stakes winners
Owners of Belmont Stakes winners
Breeders of Belmont Stakes winners
Owners of U.S. Thoroughbred Triple Crown winners
Breeders of U.S. Thoroughbred Triple Crown winners
Companies based in Texas
National Historic Landmarks in Texas
1853 establishments in Texas
Historic districts on the National Register of Historic Places in Texas
Buildings and structures in Kenedy County, Texas
Buildings and structures in Kleberg County, Texas
Ranches on the National Register of Historic Places in Texas
National Register of Historic Places in Kleberg County, Texas
National Register of Historic Places in Kenedy County, Texas
Companies established in 1853